2015 Sri Lanka Football Premier League (also known as 2015 Dialog Champions League for sponsorship reasons) was the 31st season of Sri Lanka Football Premier League. Solid SC of Anuradhapura were the defending champions.

2015 Season was different from the previous season. In this season 22 teams compete in two groups of 11 as Group A and B. Top 4 teams from each groups qualify for the Super 8 round. Each team competes with one-another in round-robin format. Team with the best record at the end of Super 8 would become the champion.

The defending champions in the previous tournament Solid SC was eliminated in the First round. The champions of this tournament will qualify for preliminary round of AFC Cup.

Colombo FC emerged champions of the Dialog Champions League 2015 by a solitary goal difference with Renown SC.

League table

Group A

Group B

Fixtures and Results

Stage 1

Championship Round

Awards
The winners of the competition were given a cash award of Rs. 750000 while the runners-up received Rs. 500000. 
Individual awards:

References

External links 
https://web.archive.org/web/20150218082614/http://www.football.lk/
 Sri Lanka 2015/16 — rsssf.com

Sri Lanka Football Premier League seasons
1
1
Sri Lanka
Sri Lanka